Emmanuel Fisher (25 September 1921 – 22 July 2001) was a British composer and conductor who was best known for leading the London Jewish Male Choir for 21 years.

During World War II, Fisher served in the British Ambulance Units that were involved in humanitarian rescue work at the liberated Bergen-Belsen concentration camp.  His work was dramatized in the 2007 Channel 4 film The Relief of Belsen, with Fisher portrayed by Iddo Goldberg.

References

1921 births
2001 deaths
British male composers
20th-century British male musicians